Woodlawn Cemetery is an all-faith cemetery located in Allouez, Wisconsin under a Green Bay address. Originally incorporated in 1857 by several prominent city leaders, burials did not begin at the cemetery until 1867. It is the city's oldest all-faiths cemetery.

History 
The cemetery was incorporated in 1857, shortly after Green Bay's official incorporation, by several Green Bay politicians as a "non-profit, non-sectarian cemetery." The founding group included future mayors Henry S. Baird, Nathan Goodell, Burley Follett, Charles D. Robinson, H. E. Eastman,  Francis X. Desnoyers, as well as future senator and U.S. Postmaster Timothy O. Howe and town postmaster Daniel W. King. The cemetery's original plots were set to be in the city's Baird Park, but were moved to the current cemetery in 1867.

Notable burials 
 Charles C. P. Arndt, Wisconsin Territory legislator, killed by fellow-legislator James Russell Vineyard.
 Henry S. Baird, Wisconsin Territory Attorney General, 7th mayor of Green Bay, cemetery founder, one of the founding fathers of the Wisconsin State Bar.
 Eleazor H. Ellis, 6th mayor of Green Bay
 Nathan Goodell, 5th and 9th mayor of Green Bay, cemetery founder
 Timothy O. Howe, judge, U.S. Senator, U.S. Postmaster General, cemetery founder
 Thomas R. Hudd, U.S. House Representative
 Gustav Küstermann, U.S. House Representative
 Morgan Lewis Martin, Wisconsin Territory delegate to the U.S. House of Representatives
 Mike Michalske, football player and coach
 Robert E. Minahan, 30th mayor of Green Bay, prominent early 20th century surgeon.
 Arthur C. Neville, 25th mayor of Green Bay
 W. C. E. Thomas, 1st mayor of Green Bay

Notes

References

Cemeteries in Wisconsin
Buildings and structures in Brown County, Wisconsin